Stephanie Bairstow (born 10 October 1994) is an Australian professional basketball player.

Professional career

WNBL
Bairstow made her professional debut with the Australian Institute of Sport during the 2011–12 season.  After her college career, Bairstow returned to the league with the new side in her home state, the South East Queensland Stars. Bairstow was signed by the Canberra Capitals for the 2016–17 season. 

She has had Off season Stints With the Brisbane Spartans in the 2016 SEABL season and with the South West Metro Pirates in the 2017 & 2018 QBL season.

College
From 2012 to 2014, Bairstow played college basketball for the Utah State Aggies located in Logan, Utah. Bairstow left the team after seven games in her junior season.

Utah State statistics

Source

Personal life
Bairstow has two brothers who also play professional basketball: former NBA player Cameron Bairstow and current NBL player Jarred Bairstow.

References

External links
 Stephanie Bairstow: WNBL
 Utah State Aggies bio

1994 births
Living people
Australian expatriate basketball people in the United States
Australian Institute of Sport basketball (WNBL) players
Australian women's basketball players
Sportswomen from Queensland
Basketball players from Brisbane
South East Queensland Stars players
Utah State Aggies women's basketball players
Forwards (basketball)
Guards (basketball)